The Turks of South Carolina also known as Sumter Turks, or Turks of Sumter County, are a group of people who have lived in the general area of Sumter County, South Carolina, since the late 18th century. According to Professor Glen Browder "they have always been a tight-knit and isolated community of people who identified as being of Turkish descent". 

As of 2018, they number approximately 400 in the town of Dalzell.

Misrepresentations of the community 
Dr. Terri Ann Ognibene, a "Sumter Turk" herself, has discussed the misrepresentations of the community: 

Early examples of their misrepresentation date to at least the 19th century. The tax collector of Sumter sent an inquiry dated December 7, 1858, to the South Carolina Committee on the Colored Population, inquiring as to whether the "descendants of Egyptians and Indians" who resided in Sumter should be taxed under the bracket of "Free Blacks, mulattoes and mestizos, or as whites." In the early 20th century some believed that they were of primarily Native American background with some admixture of Turkish. They have been mistakenly connected to a family of "Free Moors" who resided in Charleston (see Free Moors of South Carolina).

Assimilation
In their study on the Sumter Turks, Dr. Terri Ann Ognibene and Professor Glen Browder said the following regarding identity and assimilation:

History
The "Turk" community traces its history back to an early settler, Joseph Benenhaley, from the Ottoman Empire who reputedly served the colonial cause in the American Revolutionary War. He made his way to South Carolina, where he served as a scout for General Thomas Sumter during the American Revolution. The general then gave Benenhaley some land on his plantation to farm and raise a family. A few outsiders married into the family, but most who identified with the ostracized community, and their progeny considered themselves people of Turkish descent. By the mid-20th century, they numbered several hundred.

The Turks of South Carolina today include surnames such as Benenhaley, Oxendine, Scott, Hood, Buckner, Lowery, Chavis, and Ray.

Marriages in the community
The community has generally been "cautious about outside society." Consequently, "few outsiders were accepted in the community, and Turkish
people mainly married within their own crowd for generations". Hence, the repetition of family surnames throughout the generations. It is very likely that while there were no forced marriages "there were unwritten societal customs in each group regarding the acceptable parameters of marriage".

Genetic studies 
DNA reports on living members of the Turkish community who descend from Joseph Benenhaley showed that the genetic profile indicates significant connections to the Mediterranean/Middle Eastern/North African regions, along with substantial west European admixture and some potential evidence of Native American linkages. Notably, the DNA results showed no discernable contributions from Sub-Saharan Africa, contradicting criticism that the community had claimed Turkish ancestry to cover African roots.

Discrimination
The community's heritage has reflected their long experience of isolation and discrimination in rural South Carolina. Due to segregation policies in the past, there were "Turkish schools, Turkish school buses, and Turkish cinemas in this period."

See also
Turkish Americans
Ibrahim Ben Ali, early Ottoman Turkish settler in the US
Marie Tepe, 19th-century settler to the US of Turkish origin who fought for the Union army during the American Civil War

Notes

References

Further reading

Ethnic groups in South Carolina
People from Sumter County, South Carolina
Turkish-American history